Hosianna is the tenth studio album by Swedish singer-songwriter Lars Winnerbäck. It was released on 20 September 2013 and topped the Swedish Albums Chart in its first week of release. It also reached number three on VG-lista, the official Norwegian Albums Chart.

Track listing
"Vi åkte aldrig ut till havet" (4:44)
"Gå med mig vart jag går" (4:09)
"Monsterteorin" (4:43)
"Vem som helst blues" (4:53)
"Det gick inte" (3:02)
"Skolklockan" (4:50)
"Utkast till ett brev" (4:38)
"Ett slags liv" (4:49)
"När det blåser från ditt håll" (4:02)
"Hosianna" (7:10)

Charts

Weekly charts

Year-end charts

References

2013 albums
Lars Winnerbäck albums